Umberto Betti, O.F.M., S.T.D. (7 March 1922 – 1 April 2009) was an Italian priest of the Order of Friars Minor who on 24 November 2007 was appointed a cardinal-deacon of the Roman Catholic Church.

Betti was born in Pieve Santo Stefano, Province of Arezzo. He began his novitiate in the Province of St. Francis Stigmatised in Tuscany on 23 July 1937, made his first profession on 2 August 1938 and his solemn profession on 31 December 1943. He was ordained priest on 5 April 1946.

He obtained his doctorate in Dogmatic Theology and followed specialised studies at the Catholic University of Louvain in 1951-1951, after which he taught dogmatic theology in the order's study houses in Siena and Fiesole, and again in 1963–1964, after which he was appointed professor at the Pontifical University Antonianum in Rome, where he taught until 1991.

He was a consultant to the Preparatory Theological Commission for the Vatican II Council, in which he was also an expert. He contributed to the writing of the Dogmatic Constitutions Dei Verbum and Lumen Gentium, and held several posts in the Roman Curia. He was Rector Magnificus of the Pontifical Lateran University from 1991 to 1995.

On 24 November 2007, Betti was raised to the rank of Cardinal-Deacon and assigned the titular church of Ss. Vito, Modesto e Crescenzia. He died aged 87 at the Provincial Infirmary of St. Francis on the hill of Fiesole, where he had lived since the year 2000.

References 

Catholic-pages
Cardinal Umberto Betti, Cardinals of the Holy Roman Church website

1922 births
2009 deaths
People from the Province of Arezzo
21st-century Italian cardinals
Italian Friars Minor
Cardinals created by Pope Benedict XVI